Ameles aegyptiaca is a species of praying mantis native to Egypt.

References

aegyptiaca
Endemic fauna of Egypt
Mantodea of Africa
Insects of Egypt
Insects described in 1913